PRIM may stand for:

 Presence and Instant Messaging protocol
 Party of the People of Free Indonesia
 PRIM (watches)